Passage Creek is a  tributary stream of the North Fork Shenandoah River in Fort Valley, Virginia.  For most of its length it flows through a rural valley between the two spine-like ridges of Massanutten Mountain, then exits the valley by cutting a narrow gorge through the northeast end of the mountain.

Recreation
Passage Creek passes through the George Washington National Forest, managed by the United States Forest Service. It is annually stocked with trout by the Virginia Department of Game and Inland Fisheries. The stream runs along Fort Valley Road, and is accessible at the Elizabeth Furnace recreation area.

See also
List of rivers of Virginia

References

Rivers of Virginia
Rivers of Page County, Virginia
Rivers of Shenandoah County, Virginia
Rivers of Warren County, Virginia
Tributaries of the Shenandoah River